O'Reilly v Mackman [1983] UKHL 1 is a UK constitutional law case, concerning judicial review.

Facts
Convicted prisoners claimed that a decision that they lost remission of their sentences, after a riot in Hull prison, was null and void because of breaches of natural justice, as seen in St Germain [1979] QB 425. The defendants applied to have the action struck out, arguing the decisions could only be challenged by applying for judicial review. There was a requirement to be prompt.

Judgment

Court of Appeal
Lord Denning MR and the Court of Appeal held that it would be an abuse of process to allow a claim through judicial review.

House of Lords
The House of Lords held that the prisoners had to make a claim through judicial review, not for breach of statutory duty. The court had jurisdiction to grant the declarations, but the prisoners’ case was solely a claim based on public law. Order 53 (now CPR Part 54) protected public authorities from groundless or delayed attacks by its requirements, so it would be wrong to allow evasion of its limits. When public bodies make contracts, torts or have property disputes, they fall within ordinary ‘private’ law rules. Claims for JR may not be used instead.

Lord Diplock said the following:

See also

United Kingdom constitutional law

Notes

References

United Kingdom constitutional case law